Mecocerus is a genus of beetle belonging to the family Anthribidae.

Selected species 
 Mecocerus allectus
 Mecocerus asmenus Jordan
 Mecocerus assimilis
 Mecocerus gazella
 Mecocerus rhombeus Quedenfeldt, 1886
 Mecocerus wallacei Pascoe, 1860

References 

 Biolib
 Universal Biological Indexer

Anthribidae
Weevil genera